British Railways coach designations were a series of letter-codes used to identify different types of coaches, both passenger carrying and non-passenger carrying stock (NPCS). The code was generally painted on the end of the coach but non-gangwayed stock had the code painted on the side. They have been superseded by TOPS design codes.

Background
The London, Midland and Scottish Railway and the London and North Eastern Railway developed systems of identifying railway carriages with alphabetic codes. When British Railways was formed in 1948 it adapted the LNER system.

Basic principles
The codes are made up from a combination of letters, some of which can indicate more than one word; their meaning can only be determined according to their position in the code or the presence of other letters. The letters are:

These letters (except Y and Z) did not usually apply to passenger-rated but goods carrying vans (e.g. parcels vans, horse boxes, milk and fish vans). Their codes were an acronym of their traditional railway description, e.g. GUV for General Utility Vans.

List of codes used
The following list lists those codes that were used on BR cross-referred to the comparable code used by the LMS, with the exception that the letter S ("Second", later "Standard") is used where until 1956 the letter T ("Third") was used.  Suffix codes Y or Z are not shown, as these could apply to variants of any or all vehicle types.

In the LNER system, S stood for "Second", a class between First and Third (which became Second on 3 June 1956).  The original Second was more or less abolished in the 1870s as a result of the Railway Regulation Act 1844, remaining only in limited use for special services, such as those meeting ships (which retained the three-class system from which railway classifications had originated). In May 1988 BR reclassified Second to Standard but this did not alter the code.

Multiple unit coaches originally distinguished between open and corridor types by adding the letter O or K at the end (for example, TSO or TSK), and also distinguished coaches with lavatories by adding the letter L at the end (for example DMBSOL) but these fell out of use when corridor stock became less common which enabled the codes to be restricted to no more than four letters.

See also
British carriage and wagon numbering and classification

References

Further reading

British Rail numbering and classification systems
 British Rail coach designations